Mirsada Burić (born 8 April 1970) is a Bosnian long-distance runner. She competed in the women's 3000 metres at the 1992 Summer Olympics.

References

External links
 

1970 births
Living people
Athletes (track and field) at the 1992 Summer Olympics
Yugoslav female long-distance runners
Bosnia and Herzegovina female long-distance runners
Olympic athletes of Bosnia and Herzegovina
Place of birth missing (living people)